Marcel van Vliet (born 7 October 1970, Gouda) is a Dutch truck racer, best known for participating in the Dakar Rally, in which he finished third in 2010 and seventh in 2011. In the 2012 edition he won the first stage. He has 3 daughters and he is one of the owners of a company called "Van Vliet Automotive Group B.V.".

Notable results in Dakar Rally
Winner of first stage, 2011
Finished third overall, 2010
Winner of first stage, 2009

References

External links
Rider sheet for van Vliet, Dakar Rally 2012
Website for Van Vliet XL Group

1970 births
Living people
Dutch rally drivers
Dakar Rally drivers
Sportspeople from Gouda, South Holland